Paddy O'Brien is the name of:

Sports
 Paddy O'Brien (Australian rules footballer) (1893–1964)
 Paddy O'Brien (Gaelic footballer) (1925–2016), inter-county Irish Gaelic footballer
 Paddy O'Brien (rugby union) (born 1959), New Zealand international rugby union referee
 Paddy O'Brien (Tipperary hurler) (born 1979), Irish left corner-forward
 Paddy O'Brien (Éire Óg hurler), member of the 1947 Kilkenny Hurling Team
 Paddy O'Brien (Laois hurler), played in the 1949 All-Ireland Senior Hurling Championship Final
 Paddy O'Brien (fl. 1949), a Tipperary hurler

Other people
 Paddy O'Brien (accordionist) (1922–1991), Irish button accordion player and composer
 Paddy O'Brien (musician and author) (born 1945), Irish-American accordionist, born County Offaly
 Paddy O'Brien (singer) (born 1954), Irish country singer, born County Waterford
 Paddy O'Brien, minion of the Austin Powers character Dr. Evil
 Paddy (Patrick) O'Brien, multiple officers involved in IRA operations: 
see Battle of Dublin
see Clonbanin Ambush
see Kilmichael Ambush

See also
 Patrick O'Brien (disambiguation)